Faiz Mohammad Khakshar (6 August 1942) born in Kabul was an Afghanistan wrestler, who competed at the 1960 Summer Olympic Games and the 1964 Summer Olympic Games in the flyweight freestyle event, he also finished 4th at the 1962 Asian Games.

References

External links
 

1942 births
Living people
Wrestlers at the 1960 Summer Olympics
Wrestlers at the 1964 Summer Olympics
Afghan male sport wrestlers
Olympic wrestlers of Afghanistan
Wrestlers at the 1962 Asian Games
Sportspeople from Kabul
Asian Games competitors for Afghanistan